"King of Raop" is the third single by German rapper Cro. A pop and rap song, it was produced by Jopez. The lyrics and musical composition are attributed to Cro. On 30 June 2012, the music video was released. The same day, the single was released on as the third single from his debut album Raop through Chimperator Productions.

Track listing

Weekly charts

References

External links 

2012 singles
Cro (rapper) songs
2012 songs